Soergel or Sörgel is a German-language surname from a nickname for a sorrowful person from a derivative of Middle High German Sorge "sorrow", "trouble". It may refer to:
Ed Soergel (1930–1975), Canadian football player 
Herman Sörgel (1885–1952), German architect
Janet Soergel Mielke (1937), American politician and secretary
Wolfgang Soergel (born 1962), German mathematician, specializing in geometry and representation theory

References 

German-language surnames
Surnames from nicknames